Caurozercon is a genus of mites in the family Zerconidae.

References

Zerconidae
Articles created by Qbugbot